The gene rpoF (RNA polymerase, flagellum F) encodes the sigma factor sigma-28 (σ28, or RpoF), a protein in Escherichia coli and other species of bacteria. Depending on the bacterial species, this gene may be referred to as sigD or fliA. The protein encoded by this gene has been found to be necessary for flagellum formation.

References 

Escherichia coli genes